Karolin Horchler (born 9 May 1989) is a German biathlete. She competed at the Biathlon World Championships 2020.

Her older sister Nadine is also a biathlete.

Biathlon results
All results are sourced from the International Biathlon Union.

World Championships
1 medal (1 silver)

*During Olympic seasons competitions are only held for those events not included in the Olympic program.

References

External links

1989 births
Living people
German female biathletes
People from Bad Arolsen
Sportspeople from Kassel (region)
Biathlon World Championships medalists